Jameh Mosque of Bandar Abbas or Jameh Mosque of Delgosha is one of the oldest mosques in Bandar Abbas, the capital of Hormozgan province in southern Iran.

Sources 

Mosques in Iran
Mosque buildings with domes
National works of Iran
Bandar Abbas